Silago, officially the Municipality of Silago, is a 4th class municipality in the province of Southern Leyte, Philippines. According to the 2020 census, it has a population of 13,116 people. It was used to be barrio of Hinunangan until Executive Order No. 326 dated May 17, 1951 separated it from the mother town. The town has an ebony beach with unique black sand.

Etymology
The name "Silago" was a shortening of Spanish murcielago ("bat"), referring to an account when the Spaniards encountered bats in the area perching in trees locally known as tuog. The natives replied the incomprehensible question of the name of their place asked by the Spaniards saying "tua'y daghang kabug" in the belief that the Spaniards were amazed the huge number of bats present in the area that time. The place was then called "Murcielago" and over time, was shortened to its present name Silago.

However, accounts from Pigafetta on the Magellan voyage indicates a certain island in Leyte recorded as 'Cenalo' along with the recorded 'Hinnangar' (Hinunangan), and 'Abarien' (Cabalian), which in a new presentation by Greg Hontiveros on the First Mass controversy published in 2008, designated it to the Hingatungan Point in the town and therefore not an island as the account indicates.

History
Silago was once part of the Municipality of Hinunangan, and under its political jurisdictions, even during World War I and II.

During World War II, Silago was chosen as the site of submarine landing of American military arms and equipment for the Leyte guerillas. The military hardware was efficiently moved to Leyte by hundreds of volunteer guards under the Leyte area command of Col. Ruperto K. Kangleon.

After the Second World War, Silago became more progressive and had increased its population, and thus became the biggest barangay of Hinunangan. Progress served as pushing factor that Silago has availed and gained qualifications to become a municipality.

In 1948, the Secretary of National Defense Ruperto Kangleon took efforts for the conversion of barrio Silago to a municipality. And on June 20, 1950, the Municipality of Silago was inaugurated by virtue of an Executive Order No. 326 issued by President Elpidio Quirino. Such Executive Order was chartered through Republic Act No. 5962 "Creating the Municipality of Silago in the Province of Southern Leyte" on June 21, 1969.

This was made possible also through the invaluable services and voluntary effort extended by Canuto Capapas and Apolonio A. Lucero by donating real properties as lands to meet the requirements of becoming a municipality.

The first set of Municipal Officials were appointed by President Elpidio Quirino on May 17, 1951. It was headed by Felix Balagon as Municipal Mayor, Leon Fortaliza as Vice Mayor, Manuel Tomol, Enrique Sarona, Modesto Miras and Manuel Cruzada as councilors.Mr. Pedro Tomol was appointed as Municipal Secretary.

Geography

Barangays
Silago is politically subdivided into 15 barangays, 5 of which are landlocked and the remaining 10 barangays are located at the east coast.

Climate

Demographics

Economy

Education 
Elementary schools:

Almost all barangays have Elementary / Primary Schools, few are mentioned below:
 Silago Central Elementary School - Barangay Poblacion District I
 Sudmon Elementary School - Barangay Sudmon
 Hingatungan Elementary School - Barangay Hingatungan
 Awayon Elementary School - Barangay Mercedes

High schools:

There are only 4 high schools, which are strategically located at cater far flung areas.
 Silago National Vocational High School - Barangay Poblacion District II
 Hingatungan National High School - Barangay Hingatungan (located at northern portion of the municipality)
 Mercedes National High School - Barangay Mercedes (located at southern portion of the municipality)
 Katipunan National High School - Barangay Katipunan (located at western portion of the municipality)

Tourism
Silago got her name from the word “murcielago” which is a Spanish term for bat, because of this species' dominance in the locality.  Proof to this is the giant bat sanctuary at Barangay Catmon. Along the coastal barangays of the town, there are clean beaches and a structure designed by nature lying in the town's deep blue sea known as Pelada Rock, also locally known as “Batong Dako" meaning large rock, which was occupied and utilized as a camp by the Japanese Imperial Army during the Second World War. The peculiar beauty of this rock is enhanced with the abundance of birds hovering and built their nest on it, sea snakes making the rock as their dwelling place, with fish and other marine products surrounding it. The rock is located just a short distance from the shore of Barangay Laguma and Barangay Salvacion.

Farther north, is a natural rock formation with a length of more or less 50 meters from the shore and about 10 meters wide.

The interior of Silago is mountainous, in which is the town's vast forest, home of the wild pigs locally known as “Baboy Ihas”. Among all the municipalities of the province, Silago is identified to have the biggest forest area.

The Municipal Tree Park is another kind of tourist attraction in the municipality where fresh breeze and songs of the birds make the atmosphere pleasantly unique. On its northern part is a clean and clear river suitable for swimming.

In the upper portion of the town, at different locations, are waterfalls. Kagut-an Falls is more or less 1 kilometer away from the national highway, at Barangay Katipunan. This falls is paired with another falls near its vicinity, locally called as Kagut-an Dako Dos Falls, which possesses an exceptional attraction to all who sees it. In the same barangay is another falls called Kagut-an Gamay Falls. In Barangay Mercedes, about 1 kilometer distance from Mercedes Barangay Road, is Sitio Kawayan Falls with a height of about 10 meters.

Another falls is in Barangay Tubod distinctive in structure with matching cave on its opposite side.  Water from this falls, along its way meets the Lanang River flow, which also has its own unique attraction.

Aside from Lanang River, which is located at the town's mountain barangay, is the Maag River that crosses along the national highway in Poblacion District 1.  This river forms a lake that is suited for boating recreation.  At the mouth of the river is the brown fine sand beach of Silago, which is more or less 1 kilometer long.

In the months of November to February, Silago's beaches are ideal for surfing with huge sea waves, comparable to waves in Siargao.

Town Hymn
The Hymn was written and composed by Rev. Fr. Plutarco Rodriguez and Neil Mate, and was implemented by Mayor Martin Tomol Sr.

References

External links

 Silago Profile at PhilAtlas.com
 [ Philippine Standard Geographic Code]
Philippine Census Information
Local Governance Performance Management System

Municipalities of Southern Leyte
Establishments by Philippine executive order